Kudumbakodathi is a 1996 Indian Malayalam-language comedy film, directed by Viji Thampy and produced by V. S. Suresh. The film stars Innocent, Dileep, Ashokan and Kalpana in the lead roles. The film has musical score by S. P. Venkatesh.

Plot

N.D. Raman Nair a.k.a. NDR is a businessman who tries to control and protect his sons, Ramanan and Rameshan, who marry Pournami and Panchami, respectively. Then many problems occur in the house. Raman Nair decides to solve the issue by remarrying Guntur Parvathi. How things turn after that forms the story.

Cast

Soundtrack
The music was composed by S. P. Venkatesh and the lyrics were written by S. Ramesan Nair.

References

External links
 

1996 films
1990s Malayalam-language films
Films directed by Viji Thampi